Robeiro Fernando Moreno Gaviria (born November 11, 1969) is a retired male football defender from Colombia. He played for the Colombia national football team at the 1992 Summer Olympics in Barcelona, Spain, wearing the #3 jersey.

Career
Moreno played professional football for Once Caldas, Atlético Nacional and Atlético Bucaramanga.

After he retired from playing, Moreno became a football coach. He is the assistant manager of Categoría Primera B side Alianza Petrolera.

References

1969 births
Living people
Colombian footballers
Association football defenders
Colombia under-20 international footballers
Footballers at the 1992 Summer Olympics
Olympic footballers of Colombia
Once Caldas footballers
Atlético Nacional footballers
Atlético Bucaramanga footballers